Brookmont is a census-designated place and an unincorporated area in Montgomery County, Maryland, United States. Brookmont is often considered part of neighboring Bethesda because it falls within Bethesda's 20816 zip code.

Geography
As an unincorporated area, Brookmont's boundaries are not officially defined. Brookmont is, however, recognized by the United States Census Bureau as a census-designated place, and by the United States Geological Survey as a populated place located at  (38.955810, −77.127094).

Demographics

As of the census of 2000, there were 3,202 people, 1,194 households, and 920 families residing in the area as defined by the Census Bureau. The racial makeup of the area was 92.35% White, 1.66% African American, 0.31% Native American, 3.72% Asian, 0.44% from other races, and 1.53% from two or more races. Hispanic or Latino of any race were 3.97% of the population.

There were 1,194 households, out of which 37.8% had children under the age of 18 living with them, 69.4% were married couples living together, 5.9% had a female householder with no husband present, and 22.9% were non-families. 16.5% of all households were made up of individuals, and 7.3% had someone living alone who was 65 years of age or older. The average household size was 2.68 and the average family size was 2.99.

In the area, the population was spread out, with 25.8% under the age of 18, 3.4% from 18 to 24, 23.4% from 25 to 44, 31.0% from 45 to 64, and 16.4% who were 65 years of age or older. The median age was 44 years. For every 100 females, there were 94.1 males. For every 100 females age 18 and over, there were 91.5 males.

The median income for a household in the area was $138,492, and the median income for a family was $150,000. Males had a median income of $94,066 versus $57,167 for females. The per capita income for the area was $66,465. About 0.9% of families and 1.7% of the population were below the poverty line, including none of those under the age of eighteen or sixty-five or over.

See also
Cabin John-Brookmont, a census-designated place delineated in 1980 and 1990

References

 
Census-designated places in Maryland
Maryland populated places on the Potomac River
Census-designated places in Montgomery County, Maryland
Suburbs of Washington, D.C.
Upper class culture in Maryland